Monroeville is an unincorporated community in Jefferson County, in the U.S. state of Ohio.

History
A former variant name of Monroeville was Croxton, for founder Abraham Croxton. Monroeville was laid out in 1836. The name honors James Monroe, 5th President of the United States. A post office called Croxton was established in 1833, and remained in operation until 1895.

References

Unincorporated communities in Jefferson County, Ohio
Unincorporated communities in Ohio